Jim Borell (born April 25, 1983) is a professional American lacrosse player who has played with the Philadelphia Wings in the National Lacrosse League and the Los Angeles Riptide in Major League Lacrosse. Borell was signed by the San Jose Stealth of the NLL on March 18, 2009 and is a graduate of University of Maryland.

While playing at Maryland, Borell was awarded the team's "Hammer Award" in 2005 for being the team's biggest hitter, Unsung Hero Award in 2006 and "Big Man" Award as well as team captain for the 2007 season.  Borell transferred from the United States Air Force Academy to the University of Maryland after playing the 2003 season for the Falcons.

Borell was selected by the Los Angeles Riptide as a fourth round selection (46th overall) in the 2007 MLL  Draft Major League Lacrosse Collegiate Draft, but did not play in the 2007 MLL season.

Borell is the current head coach of the Loyola High School Varsity Lacrosse Team, part of the Southern Section CIF.

References

1983 births
American lacrosse players
Living people
Maryland Terrapins men's lacrosse players
Philadelphia Wings players